{Songbook} A Collection of Hits is the first greatest hits album by American country music singer Trisha Yearwood. The album was Yearwood's first to reach #1 on the Billboard country albums chart. Due to the success of the single "How Do I Live" in Australia, the album was released there (in 1998) with six extra tracks, including a duet with Australian country star Lee Kernaghan. {Songbook} A Collection of Hits also peaked at number 5 on the ARIA country charts and 22 on the all genre. The album has been certified 4× Multi-Platinum by the RIAA for US shipments of 4 million copies. It has also been certified 2× Platinum in Canada and Platinum in Australia.

Track listing

International version bonus tracks

Personnel
Garth Brooks - background vocals, duet vocals on "In Another's Eyes"
Larry Byrom - acoustic guitar
Chuck Cannon - background vocals
Mike Chapman - bass guitar
Paul Franklin - steel guitar, lap steel guitar
Garth Fundis - background vocals
Steve Gibson - electric guitar
Don Henley - duet vocals on "Walkaway Joe"
Jim Horn - saxophone
Ronn Huff - string arrangements, conductor
Paul Leim - drums
Raul Malo - background vocals
The Nashville String Machine - strings
Steve Nathan - keyboards
Jim Ed Norman - string arrangements
Michael Rhodes - bass guitar
Kim Richey - background vocals
Matt Rollings - keyboards
Milton Sledge - drums
Judson Spence - background vocals
Harry Stinson - background vocals
Lari White - background vocals
Trisha Yearwood - lead vocals, background vocals

Charts

Weekly charts

Year-end charts

Certifications

References

Trisha Yearwood compilation albums
1997 compilation albums
MCA Records compilation albums